Federicus is a historical reenactment event that takes place every year in the historic city centre of Altamura, Italy. Its name is derived from the Latin name of king Frederick II, who founded the city of Altamura and by which the event is inspired. Among other things, parades re-enact the visit of Frederick II (with his entourage) to the city of Altamura. The event usually takes place in the second half of April, and it normally lasts three days.

History
The event started in 2012 with Italian association Fortis Murgia, and since then it's been repeated every year, attracting several tourists mostly from other Italian regions and, to some degree, also from abroad. Altamura's schools are also closed during the event, mostly in order to let the students help organize it.

Gallery

References

External links
 
 La Gazzetta del Mezzogiorno - 
 

Altamura
Medieval reenactment events
Tourist attractions in Apulia
Medieval Apulia
Frederick II, Holy Roman Emperor